Palesa Nomthandazo Phumelele Modiga, professionally known as Zoë Modiga is a South African singer and songwriter. Modiga first gained recognition as contestant on The Voice South Africa 2016.

Modiga's second studio album Inganekwane (2020), debuted number one globally.

Career 
Palesa Nomthandazo Phumelele Modiga was born Overport, Durban and raised in Pietermaritzburg, KwaZulu-Natal, her musical interest began at the age of 10, singing for local music competition.

From 2013 to 2015, Modiga enrolled College of Music, University of Cape Town in Jazz performance studies. That same year, Modiga won South African Music Rights Organisation's (SAMRO) Overseas Scholarships Competition for Jazz. Following year, she contested on The Voice South Africa and made it to the Top 8.

Her debut studio album Yellow: The Novel was released in 2017. The album was nominated Best African Artist Album and Best Jazz Album at the South African Music Awards.

On June 26, 2020, her second studio album Inganekwane was released. The album debuted number one globally.

Modiga headlined to 14th Annual Mzansi Fela Festival, which was held in State Theatre, Guateng in December 2021.

Discography 
 Yellow: The Novel (2017)
  Inganekwane (2020)

Awards and nominations

References 

South African women singer-songwriters
Living people
21st-century South African women singers
Women  jazz singers
Year of birth missing (living people)
People from KwaZulu-Natal